Darran Valley is a community in the County Borough of Caerphilly, Wales. The Darran Valley consists of the valley of the Bargod Rhymni and contains the villages of Deri, Pentwyn and Fochriw. These settlements grew around the Industrial Age to serve the collieries of Fochriw, Pencarreg and Groesfaen. As of 2001, the community had a recorded population of 2,545., increasing to 2,607 in 2011.

History 
It was nationalised in 1947 and closed in 1968.

References

Caerphilly